The Cardedeu order of battle lists the troops that fought in the Battle of Cardedeu (16 December 1808) and several other battles fought between June and December in the Spanish province of Catalonia during the Peninsular War. In February 1808, Imperial French forces treacherously seized Barcelona on 29 February and Sant Ferran Castle on 15 March as well as other fortresses in Spain. The Dos de Mayo Uprising broke out when the Spanish people found that Emperor Napoleon deposed the Spanish royal family and set up his brother Joseph Bonaparte as their new king. The 12,000 Imperial French soldiers under Guillaume Philibert Duhesme occupying Catalonia were beaten at the Battles of El Bruch and Gerona in June. Though Duhesme was reinforced by another French division, the Spanish defeated him at the Second Siege of Gerona in July and August. With Duhesme blockaded in Barcelona, Napoleon appointed Laurent Gouvion Saint-Cyr as commander of the VII Corps, added two good divisions and other troops to his force, and ordered him to relieve Barcelona. Saint-Cyr succeeded in this task, winning the battles of Roses, Cardedeu and Molins de Rei in December.

Imperial French order of battle
On 10 October 1808, the VII Corps numbered 42,382 soldiers, of whom 4,948 men were in the hospital and 1,302 were detached. However, not all its assigned troops had joined by that date. Note that the Observation Corps became part of VII Corps when Saint-Cyr assumed command. It is probable that the corps counted over 50,000 men. Joseph Chabran's division was made up of veteran French units. The Provisional Cavalry regiments were created by assembling the depot squadrons, all conscripts, from as many as four different regiments. Honoré Charles Reille's division was a mass of second-class units cobbled together from National Guards, provisional battalions, Swiss, and a "French" regiment from recently annexed Tuscany. The Neapolitans were universally considered the worst troops in Europe. On the other hand, the divisions of Joseph Souham and Domenico Pino were composed of crack troops.

Spanish order of battle
The Royal Spanish army included three Irish regiments, including the Ultonia Infantry Regiment. There were also six Swiss regiments, among them the 1st Wimpfen and 2nd Reding senior Infantry Regiments. The Provincial Grenadiers were a militia formation. Uniquely among the provinces of Spain, Catalonia raised its own type of militia, the miquelets. This was a mass levy of military aged men that was armed and paid by the church parishes. They were sometimes called somatenes after the alarm-bell (somaten) used to alert them. The miquelets were organized into 1,000-man "tercios". Newly-raised units are labeled "Volunteers" or "new". Miquelets and militia have the Catalan flag. All others are regulars.

During the Siege of Roses, the garrison consisted of 150 men of the Ultonia Regiment, one-half of the 2nd of Barcelona Light Infantry Regiment, one company of the 1st Wimpfen Swiss Regiment, the Lerida and Igualada Tercios, and elements of the Berga and Figueras Tercios. These were later reinforced by a small battalion of the Borbon Regiment. Nearly all these troops went into captivity when the place surrendered on 5 December. 

One authority stated that Reding commanded two battalions each of the 1st Grenada, Baza, and Almeria Infantry Regiments at Cardedeu. Vives led newly organized Catalan units at Cardedeu, plus seven guns, but the source did not specify which units. A second historian credited the Spanish at Cardedeu with 5,000 Granadan troops under Reding and 4,000 Catalans under Vives, but did not list the individual units. This force included 600 cavalrymen and seven field guns. During the battle, Francisco Milans del Bosch was to the east with 3,000 miquelets and Luis Rebolledo de Palafox y Melci, 1st marqués de Lazán was to the north with perhaps 6,000 more soldiers. However, Milans' men were still reeling from their defeat the day before and Lazán was too slow; neither intervened at Cardedeu.

Notes

References

Peninsular War orders of battle